Sofya Gulyak (born 29 December 1979) is a Russian classical pianist. She was the first woman to win the Leeds Piano Competition.

Gulyak was born in Kazan. She studied at the Kazan State Conservatoire, Piano Academy Incontri col Maestro, and the Royal College of Music. In 2006, she won first prize in the Sigismund Thalberg International Piano Competition. In 2007, she won the William Kapell Competition and shared the Concorso F. Busoni second prize with Dinara Nadzhafova. Gulyak was the winner of the 2008 Washington International Competition of the Friday Morning Music Club, and also won ISANGYUN Competition 2008. In 2009, she won the 1st prize in the Leeds International Pianoforte Competition. She is the first female winner of the competition.

References

External links

Living people
1979 births
Russian classical pianists
Russian women pianists
Musicians from Kazan
Prize-winners of the Leeds International Pianoforte Competition
21st-century Russian women musicians
21st-century classical pianists
Women classical pianists
21st-century Russian musicians
21st-century women pianists